A scupper is an opening in the side walls of a vessel or an open-air structure, which allows water to drain instead of pooling within the bulwark or gunwales of a vessel, or within the curbing or walls of a building.

There are two main kinds of scuppers:

 Ships have scuppers at deck level, to allow for ocean or rainwater drain-off.
 Buildings with railed rooftops may have scuppers to let rainwater drain instead of pooling within the railing. Scuppers can also be placed in a parapet, for the same purpose.

References

External links
 Schematics employed in hydraulic diagrams

Watercraft components